The Harder They Come is a 1972 Jamaican crime film directed by Perry Henzell and co-written by Trevor D. Rhone, and starring Jimmy Cliff. The film is most famous for its reggae soundtrack that is said to have "brought reggae to the world".

Enormously successful in Jamaica, the film also reached the international market and has been described as "possibly the most influential of Jamaican films and one of the most important films from the Caribbean".

Plot
Ivanhoe "Ivan" Martin is a poor Jamaican man in desperate search of work. He leaves his rural home after his grandmother dies to live with his impoverished wastrel mother in Kingston, but is rebuffed. Before he can even locate her he has all his possessions stolen in a con by a street vendor he naively trusted.  He later meets José, who takes him to see Django, a Spaghetti Western. Excited by urban life, he tries to get a job but repeatedly fails.

He finally drifts into the circle of a Christian preacher. There he finds menial work, and in his spare time he turns an abandoned bicycle frame into a working bicycle, then uses it to run errands for his new boss. He gets into trouble with the preacher after he shows sexual interest in the Preacher's young virginal female ward, Elsa, then with her assistance uses his church for rehearsing secular songs he intends to record.

After being brusquely run off by the preacher (for his using the church space as a rehearsal venue) he returns to the church compound to collect his bicycle, but finds an older, much bigger former colleague has appropriated it. Challenged to take it back, Ivan does so, avoiding a broken bottle his opponent wields before slashing the man with a knife, for which he is sentenced by the local authorities to a violent whipping.

Ivan interests a prominent record producer in a song that he writes and performs, "The Harder They Come", but in spite of trying to wrangle more only gets the standard exploitative $20 offer for it. He dreams of stardom upon its release, but the stranglehold which the producer maintains on the local music industry through payola condemns Ivan to obscurity. He takes up with his lover, who has been violently driven away in a jealous rage by the preacher for "fornication".

Eventually José offers Ivan an opportunity to make a modest living running marijuana, moving the drug from the country to the city on a motorbike as part of a large police-protected network. When Ivan complains about the poor pay and what he obtusely believes is high risk, being oblivious to the collusion with the authorities that makes the thriving enterprise possible, José sets up a take-down for him with the corrupt local police official running the protection racket, Detective Jones. On Ivan's next trip he is flagged down by a policeman who routinely had waved him by; Ivan panics, and shoots the officer, who dies from his wounds and crashing his motorcycle.

Next, Ivan has a tryst with José's girlfriend. While he is in bed with her, the police surround the room and try to capture him. He shoots his way out, killing three officers. On the run, he returns to shoot and wound the girl, believing she and José betrayed him. He then finds José and pursues him, shooting at him but missing.

Ivan returns to the countryside. He is again betrayed and the police catch up with him, leading to another shootout and escape. Ivan seeks support from his closest drug-dealer friend, Pedro, who helps him hide out. Detective Jones, tasked with rounding Ivan up, temporarily shuts down his lucrative protection racket in order to starve the entire community thereby pressuring the network to hand Ivan over to the police.

Meanwhile, the record mogul releases Ivan's song in order to capitalize on his notoriety, which becomes a hit and fans his fame as a charismatic rebel. Enamoured of this image, Ivan has staged photographs of himself posing as a flagrant two-gun outlaw. He sends them to the press, which is resistant to print them. He then steals a flashy car from a resort hotel and drives it aimlessly around the countryside in a reverie.

Pedro then advises Ivan to escape to Cuba. A rendezvous with a vessel bound there is arranged, but Ivan is ambushed by a police assault team while seeking to approach it and is unable to drag himself up a boarding ladder thrown over its stern.  He passes out from his wound and finds himself beached ashore. The police approach, armed with automatic rifles; he comes out, holding his two guns, and is shot. The film ends with a woman's torso gyrating to the sound of Ivan's song over the credits.

Cast

Production
The film stars reggae singer Jimmy Cliff, who plays Ivanhoe Martin, a character based upon a real-life Jamaican criminal of that name, better known as Rhyging, who achieved fame in the 1940s. Prior to filming, the project had a working title of Rhygin. This then changed to Hard Road to Travel before finally being changed to The Harder They Come, prompting Cliff to write the song of the same name. The story very loosely follows the real Martin/Rhyging's life updated to the 1970s, though the historical Rhyging was neither a musician nor drug dealer.

Cliff's previous acting experience had come from school productions. Other major roles in the film were played by Janet Bartley (Elsa), Basil Keane (Preacher), Ras Daniel Hartman (Pedro), Beverly Anderson (Upper St. Andrew Housewife), eventually married to Michael Manley who became the Prime Minister of Jamaica, Bob Charlton (Hilton), Volair Johnson (Pushcart Boy), and well known comedians Bim and Bam: Ed "Bim" Lewis (Photographer), and Aston "Bam" Wynter (drunken husband). Legendary ska musician Prince Buster (DJ at Dance) makes a cameo in the movie, telling the audience to sit tight and listen keenly!

Production began in 1970, but "dragged [for the next two years] due to inadequate funding".

Release
The film was a sensation in Jamaica due to its naturalistic portrayal of black Jamaicans in real locations and its use of Jamaican Patois, the local creole. According to Henzell, "Black people seeing themselves on the screen for the first time created an unbelievable audience reaction".

The film premiered at the Carib Theatre in Kingston, Jamaica on June 5, 1972, and was then released in February 1973 in New York City by Roger Corman's New World Pictures to little attention. It became more popular when it was played to midnight audiences nationwide the following April. However, the popularity of the movie was limited outside of Jamaica because the local Patois spoken by the characters was so thick that it required subtitles, making it possibly "the first English language movie in history to require subtitles in the United States".

The soundtrack to the film is considered a breakthrough for reggae in the United States.

Critical reception
The film received positive reviews from critics. On review aggregator website Rotten Tomatoes, the film has a 90% score based on 41 reviews, with an average rating of 7.6/10. Roger Ebert of the Chicago Sun-Times gave the film 2 1/2 stars out of 4, writing that the "movie’s ending is an exercise in plot; its beginning and its music deserve better than that". The staff of Variety magazine wrote that the film "has a sharp and racy rhythm, in keeping with the syncopated music of the isle, plus an underlying social theme in the guise of a familiar tale".

Music 

Music credits listed at the end of the film:

"The Harder They Come" recorded at Dynamic Sounds, Kingston

"You Can Get It if You Really Want"
performed by Jimmy Cliff, 
composed by Jimmy Cliff

"Hold Your Brakes"
performed by Scotty, 
composed by D. Harriot and D. Scott

"Pressure Drop"
performed by The Maytals, 
composed by Frederick "Toots" Hibbert

"Many Rivers to Cross"
performed by Jimmy Cliff, 
composed by Jimmy Cliff

"Johnny Too Bad"
performed by The Slickers, 
composed by D. Crooks, R. Beckford, W. Bailey, T. Wilson

"007 Shanty Town"
performed by Desmond Dekker, 
composed by D. Dares

"Sweet and Dandy"
performed by The Maytals, 
composed by Frederick "Toots" Hibbert

"The Harder They Come"
performed by Jimmy Cliff, 
composed by Jimmy Cliff

"Rivers of Babylon"
performed by The Melodians, 
composed by B. Dowe

"Sitting Here in Limbo"
performed by Jimmy Cliff, 
composed by Jimmy Cliff

Legacy

Novelization
In 1980, Jamaican-American author Michael Thelwell published a novel based on the film, using the same title. Thelwell inserted many Jamaican proverbs into the novel that were unused in the film.

Digital restoration
In 2006, Prasad Corporation digitally restored the film, recapturing its original look by cleaning it frame by frame to remove dirt, tears, scratches, and other artifacts.

Stage play
In 2005, The Harder They Come was adapted into a stage musical by the Theatre Royal Stratford East and UK Arts International in the UK, with a script overseen by Henzell. The show opened on 25 March 2006, boasting the original soundtrack as well as a couple of additions, including "The Ganja Song", written by Geraldine Connor, featuring Rolan Bell as Ivan. The production later moved to the Playhouse Theatre, and was performed in Toronto and Miami.

The Harder They Come, Suzan-Lori Parks' musical adaptation of the 1972 film was scheduled to be staged at New York's Public Theater in early 2023.

Music
Punk band The Clash reference lead character Ivan in the hit song "Guns of Brixton".

See also
 List of hood films

References

General

Specific

External links
 
 
 
 
The Harder They Come an essay by Michael Dare at the Criterion Collection
 

1972 films
Jamaican drama films
1972 crime drama films
Films directed by Perry Henzell
Films set in Jamaica
Films shot in Jamaica
1970s musical drama films
Reggae films
New World Pictures films
Stoner crime films
1970s English-language films
Films about singers